Sorocephalus imbricatus, the tile-leaf clusterhead, is a flower-bearing shrub that belongs to the genus Sorocephalus and forms part of the fynbos. The plant is native to the Western Cape where it is found in the Piketberg, Groot Winterhoek and Elandskloof mountains. However, plants were last observed at the latter two sites 50 years ago.

Fire destroys the plant but the seeds survive. The plant is bisexual and pollination takes place through the action of insects. The fruit ripens, two months after flowering, and the seeds fall to the ground where they are spread by ants.

References

External links 
 Threatened Species Programme | SANBI Red List of South African Plants
 Sorocephalus imbricatus (Tile-leaf clusterhead)
 https://www.proteaatlas.org.za/Protea_Atlas_Sorocephalus.pdf
 Tileleaf Powderpuff

Proteaceae
Flora of South Africa